The National Standard Examination in Chemistry or NSEC is an examination in chemistry for higher secondary school students in India, usually conducted in the end of November. The examination is organized by the Indian Association of Chemistry Teachers. Over 30,000 students, mainly from Standard 12, sit for this examination.

Eligibility

The examination is intended for students in 12th standard, though 11th standard students are also allowed to take the examination.

Importance

The top 1% students from this examination are selected to sit for the Indian National Chemistry Olympiad. The theory part of the examination is held in the last week of January. The top 30 among all students are selected for the Orientation-Cum-Selection-Camp (OCSC), Chemistry.

Format

The NSEC contains only multiple choice questions. The questions include physical chemistry, organic chemistry, and inorganic chemistry. The stress on biochemistry is more in the NSEC than in the typical school syllabi.

Fee

As per the new revised norms the fee for the NSEC is about Rs. 150. Application for this examination is typically handled through the school/college to which the student is affiliated.

References

See also
 Indian National Chemistry Olympiad
 India at the IPhO

Chemistry education
Chemistry Olympiads in India
School examinations in India